Boris Mikhailovich Moiseev (4 March 1954 – 27 September 2022) was a Soviet and Russian singer, choreographer, dancer, writer, actor, head of a dance group, and author of popular shows in Russia. He was a Merited Artist of Russia (2006).

Early life
Boris Moiseev was born in prison in Mogilev, Byelorussian SSR, Soviet Union, his mother was being held as a disenfranchised element during the communist regime. He spent his childhood and teenage years among his Lithuanian Jewish aunts in Mogilev. To strengthen his health, Boris was sent to a dancing school. Since then dancing took over all his interests and turned into a lifetime passion. He dropped out of the school, packed his bags and ran away to Minsk. There Boris got accepted to a choreography school and became a professional classical dancer.

Career beginning
Boris had all the skills to succeed as a classical dancer on the stage but he preferred modern dance. After his graduation Moiseev was expelled from Minsk because of his very open, for that time, ways of self-expression. He moved to Kharkiv where Moiseev became a ballet teacher but in 1975 he was expelled from Komsomol and left Kharkiv for Kaunas. He became a head of the Lithuanian dance group Trimitas. In 1978 Moiseev created famous dancing trio Ekspressiya which became a part of Alla Pugacheva's studio. In 1987 the trio quit working with Pugacheva and went on tours to the United States, Italy, and France. The trio has existed and for a very long time. In addition Moiseev was invited to work as a ballet teacher for many American shows.

Return to Russia
Moiseev came back to Russia in 1991, filming a documentary on Ekspressia. He died from a stroke in Moscow on 27 September 2022, at the age of 68.

Health Issues and Death (2011-2022)
Moiseev suffered three strokes between 2011 and 2022. As a result of the first two strokes, Moiseev became partially immobilized on his left side and suffered slurred speech. Despite his health difficulties, he continued to appear on television. During these years, he was routinely attended to at home by concert director Sergei Gorokh. On 27 September 2022, Gorokh attended to Moiseev and found Moiseev deceased in bed. He was 68.

Discography

CD albums
Child of Vice (1996)
Holiday! Holiday! (1998)
Just a Nutcracker (1999)
In secret... (2000)
Swan (2000)
Shall we dance?! (2001)
Alien (2002)
Beloved person (2004)
Angel (2006)
Bird. Live Sound (2007)
Pastor. The best of men (2012)

DVD albums
Boris Moiseev. Just a Nutcracker (2005)
Boris Moiseev and his lady: 5 years later (2005)
Boris Moiseev.
Boris Moiseev. Swan (2005)
Boris Moiseev. Kingdom of Love (2005)
Forever yours... Boris Moiseev (2005)
Ladies and Gentlemen (2009)
Desert (2009)

References

External links

Moiseev's biography on wwww.gay.ru (February 2004) 

 

1954 births
2022 deaths
Belarusian Jews
Belarusian musicians
Russian gay actors
Russian gay musicians
Honored Artists of the Russian Federation
Jewish singers
Gay singers
Russian LGBT singers
People from Mogilev
Russian Jews
Soviet choreographers
Russian choreographers
Soviet singers
Russian pop singers
Winners of the Golden Gramophone Award